Actaea podocarpa, the mountain bugbane or mountain black-cohosh, is a species of flowering plant in the buttercup family. It is native to the eastern United States, where it is found in the Appalachian Mountains, with a disjunct population in Illinois. It is found in rich, mesic forests often in boulder-strewn coves.

Actaea podocarpa is a large perennial herb. It is one of the later flowering of the eastern Actaea, producing white flowers in summer through fall.

References

podocarpa
Flora of the United States